The Bredgar and Wormshill Light Railway (BWLR) is located near the villages of Wormshill and Bredgar in Kent, just south of Sittingbourne.

The BWLR is a private line which has been built up as a hobby by a group of friends since the early 1970s. It is a fully operational line, operated to a high standard, with a station, engine sheds and workshops at Warren Wood station and a smaller station at the other end of the line, known as Stony Shaw.

The line is open to the public on the first Sunday of each month and most Wednesdays throughout the summer to raise money to maintain and manage the collection. On event days a number of other attractions are on display including a model railway, a Dutch street organ, a traction engine  a steam roller, a Victorian beam engine, an American fire department Ladder truck and a range of old tractors and cars.

The Tearoom is open Wednesday thru Sunday (9:00 - 15:00) throughout the year offering a selection of teas, coffees, cakes, sandwiches snacks and lunches.

In June 2011, the railway appeared briefly in a segment filmed for the BBC's Saturday Kitchen programme which aired on 18 June 2011.

The Stations 
 Warren Wood Station
 Stony Shaw Station

Rolling stock

Operational steam locomotives

Steam locomotives undergoing overhaul or restoration

Operational diesel locomotives

Diesel locomotives undergoing overhaul or restoration

Locomotives no longer at the railway

Traction engines 

The museum has four steam road locomotives in its collection; some are operational and steamed on open days and others are undergoing repair, restoration or overhaul.

Cars

Bean cars
The BWLR is home to a collection of Bean cars.

Other cars

Other exhibits

Other exhibits to be found at the BWLR include:

Beam engine

An 1870 beam engine built by Thomas Horn to a design by James Watt. One of two supplied to a waterworks at Ashford. Acquired in 1988 and restored to working order.

Twinning 

The BWLR is twinned with the Chemin de Fer de La Valée de l'Ouche (CFVO), Bligny-sur-Ouche, Côte-d'Or, France.

See also 

British narrow gauge railways

References 

Heritage railways in Kent
2 ft gauge railways in England
Museums in the Borough of Maidstone
Railway museums in England